The non-marine mollusks of Cambodia are a part of the molluscan fauna of Cambodia (the wildlife of Cambodia). A number of species of non-marine mollusks are found in the wild in Cambodia.

Freshwater gastropods 

The lower Mekong River area, which includes parts of Thailand, Laos and Cambodia, is considered to be a biodiversity hotspot for freshwater gastropods, with dominant taxa from the families Pomatiopsidae, Stenothyridae, Buccinidae and Marginellidae.

Pomatiopsidae
 Neotricula aperta (Temcharoen, 1971)

Ampullariidae
 ...

Land gastropods 

Cyclophoridae
 Cyclophorus bensoni (Pfeiffer, 1854)
 Cyclophorus cambodgensis Morlet, 1884
 Cyclophorus cantori (Benson, 1851)
 Cyclophorus fulguratus Pfeiffer, 1852
 Cyclophorus paviei Morlet, 1884
 Cyclophorus pfeifferi Reeve, 1861
 Cyclophorus saturnus Pfeiffer, 1862
 Cyclophorus speciosus (Philippi, 1847)
 Cyclophorus volvulus (O.F. Müller, 1774)

Camaenidae
 Amphidromus

Dyakiidae
 Quantula striata (Gray, 1834)
 Bertia cambjiensis
 Bertia pergrandis

Diapheridae
 Diaphera saurini Benthem Jutting, 1962

Bivalvia
Cyrenidae
 Corbicula baudoni 
 Corbicula blandiana 
 Corbicula bocourti 
 Corbicula castanea 
 Corbicula cyreniformis 
 Corbicula erosa 
 Corbicula lydigiana 
 Corbicula moreletiana 
 Corbicula siamensis 
 Corbicula tenuis 

Unionidae
 Ensidens ingallsianus 
 Ensidens sagittarius 
 Harmandia somboriensis 
 Radiatula pilata 
 Pseudodon inoscularis

See also
 List of marine molluscs of Cambodia

Lists of molluscs of surrounding countries:
 List of non-marine molluscs of Thailand
 List of non-marine molluscs of Laos
 List of non-marine molluscs of Vietnam
 List of non-marine molluscs of Malaysia

References

Molluscs
Cambodia
Cambodia